Siripon Kaewduang-Ngam (born 27 July 1994) is a Thai competitive windsurfer. She competed at the 2016 Summer Olympics in Rio de Janeiro, in the women's RS:X.

References

External links
 
 
 

1994 births
Living people
Siripon Kaewduang-ngam
Female windsurfers
Siripon Kaewduang-ngam
Siripon Kaewduang-ngam
Sailors at the 2016 Summer Olympics – RS:X
Sailors at the 2020 Summer Olympics – RS:X
Youth Olympic gold medalists for Thailand
Sailors at the 2010 Summer Youth Olympics
Asian Games medalists in sailing
Siripon Kaewduang-ngam
Sailors at the 2014 Asian Games
Sailors at the 2018 Asian Games
Medalists at the 2014 Asian Games
Medalists at the 2018 Asian Games
Siripon Kaewduang-ngam
Siripon Kaewduang-ngam
Southeast Asian Games medalists in sailing
Competitors at the 2011 Southeast Asian Games
Siripon Kaewduang-ngam